Tony Blair was Leader of the Labour Party and Leader of the Opposition from his election as Leader on 21 July 1994 until he became Prime Minister on 2 May 1997. Blair became leader upon the death of John Smith.

Prior to being Leader of the Opposition, Blair served as the Shadow Minister for Trade (1987-1988), the Shadow Secretary of State for Energy (1988-1989), the Shadow Secretary of State for Employment (1989-1992), and the Shadow Home Secretary (1992-1994). After the sudden death of John Smith, the Labour Party held a leadership election, which Blair ran for alongside John Prescott and Margaret Beckett, and won, receiving 57.0% votes.

Under Blair, the Labour Party used the phrase "New Labour" to distance itself from previous Labour politics and the traditional idea of socialism. Despite opposition from Labour's left-wing, he abolished Clause IV, the party's formal commitment to the nationalisation of the economy, weakened trade union influence in the party, and committed to the free market and the European Union. Blair's Shadow Cabinet ceased to exist upon him becoming Prime Minister following the 1997 general election.

Shadow Cabinet list

Initial Shadow Cabinet
On 20 October 1994, following the 1994 Shadow Cabinet elections, Blair announced his first Shadow Cabinet.

 Tony Blair – Leader of Her Majesty's Most Loyal Opposition and Leader of the Labour Party
 John Prescott – Deputy Leader of Her Majesty's Most Loyal Opposition and Deputy Leader of the Labour Party
 Lord Richard – Leader of the Opposition in the House of Lords
 Derek Foster – Labour Chief Whip in the House of Commons
 Lord Graham of Edmonton – Labour Chief Whip in the House of Lords
 Lord Irvine of Lairg – Shadow Lord Chancellor
 Gordon Brown – Shadow Chancellor of the Exchequer
 Robin Cook – Shadow Foreign Secretary
 Jack Straw – Shadow Home Secretary
 David Clark – Shadow Secretary of State for Defence
 David Blunkett – Shadow Secretary of State for Education
 Harriet Harman – Shadow Secretary of State for Employment
 Frank Dobson – Shadow Secretary of State for the Environment
 Margaret Beckett – Shadow Secretary of State for Health
 Ann Taylor – Shadow Leader of the House of Commons and Shadow Minister for the Citizen's Charter
 Donald Dewar – Shadow Secretary of State for Social Security
 Chris Smith – Shadow Secretary of State for National Heritage and Shadow Minister with special responsibility for the Information Superhighway
 Jack Cunningham – Shadow Secretary of State for Trade and Industry
 Michael Meacher – Shadow Secretary of State for Transport
 George Robertson – Shadow Secretary of State for Scotland
 Ron Davies – Shadow Secretary of State for Wales
 Mo Mowlam – Shadow Secretary of State for Northern Ireland
 Joan Lestor – Shadow Minister for Overseas Development
 Gavin Strang – Shadow Minister of Agriculture, Fisheries and Food

1995 reshuffle
Blair made a number of significant changes to the Shadow Cabinet on 19 October 1995, following the 1995 Shadow Cabinet elections. Foster, who had been elected to the post, acceded to Blair's request that he step aside as Chief Whip; he was appointed Shadow Chancellor of the Duchy of Lancaster and Shadow Minister responsible for the Citizen's Charter, taking the latter from Taylor, who remained Shadow Leader of the House. Dewar was appointed Chief Whip under a new rule that made the job appointive and added on additional elective seat in the Shadow Cabinet. Chris Smith replaced Dewar at Social Security, and was replaced as Shadow National Heritage Secretary by Cunningham. Responsibility for the Information Superhighway was transferred from Shadow National Heritage Secretary to a junior Shadow Trade and Industry minister (Geoff Hoon). Cunningham was in turn replaced at the Trade and Industry brief by Beckett. Harman took over the Health portfolio Beckett had held. Blunkett added Harman's Employment portfolio to his own to reflect the created of the Department for Education and Employment.

Michael Meacher, while remaining in the Shadow Cabinet, became Blunkett's deputy as Shadow Minister for Employment, leaving the Transport brief to Clare Short, newly elected to the Shadow Cabinet. Another newcomer, Tom Clarke, was appointed to the new post of Shadow Minister for Disabled People's Rights.

 Tony Blair – Leader of Her Majesty's Most Loyal Opposition and Leader of the Labour Party
 John Prescott – Deputy Leader of Her Majesty's Most Loyal Opposition and Deputy Leader of the Labour Party
 Lord Richard – Leader of the Opposition in the House of Lords
 Donald Dewar – Labour Chief Whip in the House of Commons
 Lord Graham of Edmonton – Labour Chief Whip in the House of Lords
 Lord Irvine of Lairg – Shadow Lord Chancellor
 Gordon Brown – Shadow Chancellor of the Exchequer
 Robin Cook – Shadow Foreign Secretary
 Jack Straw – Shadow Home Secretary
 David Clark – Shadow Secretary of State for Defence
 David Blunkett – Shadow Secretary of State for Education and Employment
 Frank Dobson – Shadow Secretary of State for the Environment
 Harriet Harman – Shadow Secretary of State for Health
 Ann Taylor – Shadow Leader of the House of Commons
 Chris Smith – Shadow Secretary of State for Social Security
 Jack Cunningham – Shadow Secretary of State for National Heritage and Shadow Minister with special responsibility for the Information Superhighway
 Margaret Beckett – Shadow Secretary of State for Trade and Industry
 Michael Meacher – Shadow Minister for Employment
 Clare Short – Shadow Secretary of State for Transport
 George Robertson – Shadow Secretary of State for Scotland
 Ron Davies – Shadow Secretary of State for Wales
 Mo Mowlam – Shadow Secretary of State for Northern Ireland
 Joan Lestor – Shadow Minister for Overseas Development
 Gavin Strang – Shadow Minister of Agriculture, Fisheries and Food
 Derek Foster – Shadow Minister for the Citizen's Charter
 Tom Clarke – Shadow Minister for Disabled People's Rights

Changes
 1 July 1996: Harriet Harman and Chris Smith swap posts.
 25 July 1996: Joan Lestor stood down at the 1996 Shadow Cabinet election, as she was standing down at the impending general election. She was replaced as Shadow Minister for Overseas Development by Short, who was replaced at Transport by Andrew Smith. Meacher took the new position of Shadow Minister for Environmental Protection (a post separate from Shadow Environment Secretary).

See also
 1994 Labour Party (UK) Shadow Cabinet election
 1995 Labour Party (UK) Shadow Cabinet election
 1996 Labour Party (UK) Shadow Cabinet election

References

1994 establishments in the United Kingdom
1994 in British politics
1995 in British politics
1996 in British politics
1997 in British politics
Blair
Official Opposition (United Kingdom)
Tony Blair
1997 disestablishments in the United Kingdom
British shadow cabinets